The 1895 United Kingdom general election in Ireland took place from 13 to 29 July 1895. The divide between the anti-Parnellite Irish National Federation and the pro-Parnellite Irish National League continued, and with only minor variation in seats.
In the overall election result, the Conservative–Liberal Unionist coalition beat the Liberal Party government led by the Earl of Rosebery. Lord Salisbury returned as Prime Minister of the United Kingdom, having previously served from 1885 to 1886, and again from 1886 to 1892.

Results

See also
 History of Ireland (1801–1923)

References

1895
Ireland
July 1895 events
1895 elections in Ireland